Live from Manila is a 2006 album recorded by the R&B vocalist Angela Bofill.

This album was a milestone in Bofill’s 28-year career. It is her first live concert recording, as well as her final release, following her stroke on January 10, 2006. Performing before a packed Merk’s Bistro in Manila, Philippines, she covered signature hits that brought her to the attention of the music world. 

Since it was released after the first stroke Bofill suffered, all proceeds from the album went to cover her medical expenses.

Track listing
"Let Me Be the One" - 5:07
"Dialogue" - :18
"Tonight I Give In" - 3:44
"Time to Say Goodbye" - 5:36
"Still in Love" - 4:54
"Break It to Me Gently" - 4:04
"You Should Know By Now" - 3:40
"Something About You" - 4:34
"Ain't Nothing Like the Real Thing" - 3:31
"This Time I'll Be Sweeter" - 4:26
"Angel of the Night" - 8:38

Personnel
 Angela Bofill - vocals
 Bond Samson - keyboards
 Meong Pacana - bass guitar
 Cesar Aguas - guitar
 Mike Alba - drums
 Kitchie Molina - backing vocals
 Babsie Molina - backing vocals
 Sylvia Macaraeg - backing vocals
 Lorrie ILustre - musical director/arranger

References

Angela Bofill albums
2006 live albums